The 1994–95 League of Wales was the third season of the League of Wales following its establishment in 1992. The league was won by Bangor City, their second title.

League table

Results

References

Cymru Premier seasons
1994–95 in Welsh football leagues
Wales